Hilal Altınbilek (born 11 February 1991) is a Turkish actress and model.

Life and career 
Altınbilek was born on 11 February 1991 in İzmir. Her maternal family is of Croatian descent. Other part of her family is Albanian from Mitrovica, Kosovo. She became interested in acting while in primary school. While studying at Ege University School of Communications, she started acting. She then participated in a beauty pageant, in which she ranked among the top 5. She subsequently started working as a model. Between 2009 and 2010, she studied acting at Müjdat Gezen Art Center in Istanbul. She was also trained by Contemporary Drama Society and Ali Haydar Elçığ. Altınbilek made her television debut in 2011 with a role in Derin Sular opposite Şükrü Özyıldız. In 2013, she joined the cast of Karagül as Özlem, acting alongside Ece Uslu, Şerif Sezer and Mesut Akusta. The series marked the breakthrough in her career. In 2016, she appeared in the TV series Hayatımın Aşkı, playing the role of Nil. Since 2018, she has been portraying the character of Züleyha in the TV series Bir Zamanlar Çukurova. She made her cinematic debut with the drama movie Çocuklar Sana Emanet, written and directed by Çağan Irmak, in which she shared the leading role with Engin Akyürek.

Filmography

Television

Film

References

External links 

 
 

Living people
1991 births
Turkish television actresses
Turkish film actresses
Ege University alumni
Actresses from İzmir
Turkish people of Albanian descent
Turkish people of Croatian descent
Turkish female models
Turkish twins
Twin models